William Hines may refer to:

William Hines (journalist), American journalist
William Henry Hines, U.S. Representative from Pennsylvania
William Hines, founder of the Heron Cross Pottery, Staffordshire
Bill Hines, American custom car builder
Willie Hines, Australian rules footballer

See also
William Hine, English organist and composer